Looking for Toxin X (Czech: Hledá se Toxin X) is a short Czechoslovakian popular science documentary about LSD.

Plot

A dose of LSD is given to a DAMU theatre student, Petr Oliva, by the Czech psychiatrist Stanislav Grof. Special effects convey the subjective experience of the experimental subject. The film's central premise is the search for ‘toxin x’, which is supposed to be at the root of all mental disorders. The medics believe that LSD will help them locate it.

Cast
 Stanislav Grof
 Petr Oliva
 Vaclav Voska (Narrator)

Production

The whole film crew were also given LSD during filming. The experimental subject Oliva (who went on to become a prominent Czech actor) later recalled that the reason everyone was given the drug was because, “we had to see for ourselves what happens to a person [when they are given the drug].”

Excerpts from the film appear in the documentary LSD made in ČSSR (2015) directed by Pavel Křemen.”

References

External links
 

1962 films
1960s Czech-language films
1962 drama films
CinemaScope films
Czechoslovak documentary films
Czech documentary films